This is a list of the 59 candidates who ran for the Christian Heritage Party of Canada in the 40th Canadian federal election.

Alberta - 28 seats

British Columbia - 36 seats

Manitoba - 14 Seats

Nova Scotia - 11 seats

Ontario - 106 seats

Prince Edward Island - 4 seats

Quebec - 75 seats

Saskatchewan - 14 seats

See also
Results of the Canadian federal election, 2008
Results by riding for the Canadian federal election, 2008

References

Candidates in the 2008 Canadian federal election
2008